Grant McCann Erickson is a Sri Lankan advertising agency and part of the McCann Worldgroup.

History
Grant McCann Erickson was founded by Sri Lankan media personality Reggie Candappa and is currently led by his daughter Neela Marikkar.

References

External links
 McCann Erickson Official site
 Grant McCann Erickson Sri Lanka dabbles in Mojo Magic Arts
 Grant McCann accelerates training programme
 Grant McCann Erickson wins 'Campaign of the Year Award'
 Gold “Away From Home” for Grant McCann and Srilankan Airlines"
 Grant’s expect "phenomenal growth’’ with Air Lanka account

Interpublic Group